Rennes is a station on line 12 of the Paris Métro in the 6th arrondissement.

Located in the 6th arrondissement, part of the Left Bank of the city, Rennes is one of a number of Line 12 stations underneath Boulevard Raspail, in this case at its intersection with Rue de Rennes. It is from this street that it takes its name, in turn named after the city of Rennes.

The station opened on 5 November 1910 as part of the original section of the Nord-Sud Company's line A between Porte de Versailles and Notre-Dame-de-Lorette. On 27 March 1931 line A became line 12 of the Métro. The station was closed during World War II, and did not reopen until September 1968. For a period of time whilst closed, it was used to experiment with advertising schemes which could be viewed from passing trains.

Until 2004, this station was closed after 8pm Monday to Saturday, and was also closed all day on Sundays and public holidays. Today, it is open according to the same schedule as all other Métro stations.

Station layout 

Paris Métro stations in the 6th arrondissement of Paris
Railway stations in France opened in 1910